Dabgram-Phulbari Assembly constituency is an assembly constituency in Jalpaiguri district in the Indian state of West Bengal.

Overview
As per orders of the Delimitation Commission, No. 19 Dabgram-Phulbari Assembly constituency covers Ward Nos. 31 to 44 of Siliguri municipal corporation and Dabgram I, Dabgram II, Fulbari I and Fulbari II gram panchayats of Rajganj community development block,

Dabgram-Phulbari Assembly constituency is part of No. 3 Jalpaiguri (Lok Sabha constituency) (SC).

Members of Legislative Assembly

For MLAs from the area prior to 2011 see Kranti Assembly constituency

Election results

2021 Election

2016 Election

2011
In the 2011 election, Goutam Deb of Trinamool Congress defeated his nearest rival Dilip Singh of CPI(M).

References

Assembly constituencies of West Bengal
Politics of Jalpaiguri district